Macrocheilus bensoni is a species of ground beetle in the subfamily Anthiinae. It was described by Hope in 1838.

References

Anthiinae (beetle)
Beetles described in 1838